The canton of Le Grand-Lemps is an administrative division of the Isère department, eastern France. Its borders were modified at the French canton reorganisation which came into effect in March 2015. Its seat is in Le Grand-Lemps.

It consists of the following communes:
 
Apprieu
Belmont
Bévenais
Bilieu
Biol
Bizonnes
Blandin
Burcin
Châbons
Charavines
Chassignieu
Chélieu
Chirens
Colombe
Doissin
Eydoche
Flachères
Le Grand-Lemps
Izeaux
Longechenal
Massieu
Montferrat
Montrevel
Oyeu
Saint-Didier-de-Bizonnes
Saint-Ondras
Saint-Sulpice-des-Rivoires
Val-de-Virieu
Valencogne
Villages du Lac de Paladru

References

Cantons of Isère